Long Legs, Long Fingers is a 1966 West German comedy crime film directed by Alfred Vohrer and starring Senta Berger, Joachim Fuchsberger and Martin Held.

The film's sets were designed by Isabella and Werner Schlichting. It was shot at the Spandau Studios in Berlin and on location at Charlottenburg Palace and Caesarea in Israel.

Cast
 Senta Berger as Doris Holberg
 Joachim Fuchsberger as Robert Hammond
 Martin Held as Baron Holberg
 Irene von Meyendorff as Lady Hammond
 James Robertson Justice as Sir Hammond
 Hanns Lothar as Emile Cavin
 Helga Sommerfeld as Sarah Hammond
 Walter Wilz as Sammy Snapper
 Tilo von Berlepsch as Prosecutor
 Lia Eibenschütz as Cavin's Mutter
 Alexander Engel as Arzt
 Cora Roberts as Model
 Friedrich Schoenfelder as General
 Rudolf Schündler as Inspektor
 Hilde Sessak as Wärterin
 Heinz Spitzner as Polizist
 Eduard Wandrey as Gerichtsvorsitzender
 Zeev Berlinsky as Diamantenhehler Snapper

References

Bibliography 
 Bock, Hans-Michael & Bergfelder, Tim. The Concise CineGraph. Encyclopedia of German Cinema. Berghahn Books, 2009.

External links 
 

1966 films
1960s crime comedy films
German crime comedy films
West German films
1960s German-language films
Films directed by Alfred Vohrer
1966 comedy films
Films shot at Spandau Studios
1960s German films